Bruce Reimers (born September 28, 1960) is a former American football guard who played ten seasons with the Cincinnati Bengals and Tampa Bay Buccaneers in the National Football League.

High school career
From 1975 to 1979 Reimers played at Humboldt High School in Humboldt, Iowa. Weighing 225 pounds, he earned 1st team defense honors and was nominated into the IHSAA Football Hall of Fame.

College career
Reimers played four years at Iowa State University. During his first year of college he was switched from defensive line to offensive line due to injury. While playing offensive guard he put on 45 pounds, going from his high school weight of 225 to 270 at the end of his college career, and now felt he had enough strength and experience to enter the NFL draft. He was drafted 204th pick overall in the 8th round of the 1984 draft by the Cincinnati Bengals.

Life in the NFL 
Reimers was drafted in the 1984 draft, and played in 15 games for the Bengals that season. He led them to an average 8-8 season, but fell short of the playoffs. He played mostly offensive guard and occasionally offensive tackle the majority of the games throughout his first three years for the Bengals. In the 1987 season, Reimers was plagued by an ankle injury, only playing in 10 games where the Bengals went 4-11, but bounced back in the 1988 season, in which he played in all 16 games of the regular season and all the way to Super Bowl XXIII, which they lost to the San Francisco 49ers.

Reimers played 15 games in the 1989 season, and suffered a severe ankle injury in 1990. He finished his career with the Bengals in the 1991 season where they went 3-13, and was traded to the Tampa Bay Buccaneers where he played in two more seasons, going 5-11 in each of his last two NFL seasons.

References

https://web.archive.org/web/20070930025622/http://www.databasefootball.com/players/playerpage.htm?ilkid=REIMEBRU01
 
http://www.desmoinesregister.com/apps/pbcs.dll/article?AID=/20071025/SPORTS08/710250400/1003/NEWS
http://www.iahsaa.org/football/ARCHIVES/FB.7.IHSAA.PLAYERS.HF.pdf

1960 births
Living people
American football offensive guards
Cincinnati Bengals players
Iowa State Cyclones football players
Tampa Bay Buccaneers players
People from Humboldt, Iowa
People from Algona, Iowa
Players of American football from Iowa
Ed Block Courage Award recipients